The Forgotten Maggies (2009) is a documentary made by Irish film maker Steven O'Riordan about the Magdalene laundries. It is the only Irish-made documentary on the subject. It was launched at the Galway Film Fleadh 2009. It was screened on the Irish television station TG4 in 2011, attracting over 360,000 viewers. The women who appeared in the documentary Mary Teresa Collins, Mary King, Kathleen Legg, Maureen O'Sullivan, were the first Magdalene women to meet with Irish government officials. These women brought national and international attention to the subject.

References

2009 documentary films
English-language Irish films